Latvia's First Party/Latvian Way (LPP/LC) was a political party in Latvia created from the merger of the Christian-democratic Latvia's First Party (LPP), the liberal Latvian Way (LC) and the regionalist We for our District and Vidzeme Union in 2007. These parties had already formed an electoral coalition in 2006. The unified party was led by Ainārs Šlesers, the former LPP chairman. It was dissolved in December 2011.

At the 2010 election, the party ran as part of For a Good Latvia with the People's Party.  LPP/LC won three of the alliance's eight seats. After the People's Party's dissolution in 2011, the party renamed itself the Šlesers LPP/LC Reform Party and ran alone in the 2011 election, but won only 2.4% of the vote: failing to cross the 5% electoral threshold, and so lost all of its seats. The party then had its name reverted to LPP/LC. At the end of 2011, the party congress decided to disband the party.

References

External links
Official site 

Defunct liberal political parties
Defunct political parties in Latvia
Political parties established in 2007
Conservative parties in Latvia
Liberal parties in Latvia